Boniface Nyema Dalieh (December 9, 1933 – April 25, 2014) was a Liberian Roman Catholic bishop.

Ordained to the priesthood in 1965, he was named the Vicar Apostolic of Cape Palmas on December 17, 1973, and titular bishop of Talaptula. He received his episcopal consecration on 17 March 1974 from Thomas Joseph Brosnahan, with Francis Carroll and Anthony Saliu Sanusi as co-consecrators. On December 19, 1981, this Vicariate Apostolic was promoted as the Diocese of Cape Palmas, and Bishop Dalieh become the first diocesan bishop until retiring on October 15, 2008.

Notes

1933 births
2014 deaths
Liberian Roman Catholic bishops
Presidents of Inter-territorial Catholic Bishops' Conference of The Gambia and Sierra Leone
Roman Catholic bishops of Cape Palmas